The 2020–21 UConn Huskies men's ice hockey season was the 61st season of play for the program, the 23rd at the Division I level, and the 7th season in the Hockey East conference. The Huskies represented the University of Connecticut and were coached by Mike Cavanaugh, in his 8th season.

Season
As a result of the ongoing COVID-19 pandemic the entire college ice hockey season was delayed. Because the NCAA had previously announced that all winter sports athletes would retain whatever eligibility they possessed through at least the following year, none of Connecticut's players would lose a season of play. However, the NCAA also approved a change in its transfer regulations that would allow players to transfer and play immediately rather than having to sit out a season, as the rules previously required.

UConn began the season going through a gauntlet or ranked teams. The stiff competition handed the Huskies a 1–4–1 record and left the team with wallowing near the bottom of the conference standings. Despite the bad start, Connecticut turned its season around with a solid performance in January. While facing a slightly easier schedule, the Huskies ended the month a game over .500 and, after defeating Northeastern at the start of February, the team found itself in the top-20. The ranking didn't last long, however, and Connecticut's 4-game losing streak nearly ended any hope for the team. Winning the last two games of the regular season put the Huskies at .500 and, because Hockey East used a power index for ranking for the 2021 season, UConn finished 4th in the conference, the best result to date.

In spite of their mediocre record, Connecticut had a small chance to receive an at-large bid to the NCAA Tournament but it would need a good performance to make itself stand out from the other 'bubble teams'. They got a good chance in the conference quarterfinals, facing Providence at home. The Huskies started slow and were badly outshot in the first period. When they did finally score the Friars had already built a 3-oal lead and their opponents cruised to a 6–1 victory.

Darion Hanson, Ryan Keane, Matt Pasquale, and Bradley Stone sat out the season.

Departures

Recruiting

Roster
As of February 12, 2021.

Standings

Schedule and Results

|-
!colspan=12 style=";" | Regular Season

|-
!colspan=12 style=";" |

Scoring statistics

Goaltending statistics

Rankings

USCHO did not release a poll in week 20.

Awards and honors

Players drafted into the NHL

2021 NHL Entry Draft

† incoming freshman

References

UConn Huskies men's ice hockey seasons
Connecticut Huskies
Connecticut Huskies
Connecticut Huskies
Connecticut Huskies men's ice hockey
Connecticut Huskies men's ice hockey